Romanum may refer to :

Administration
The Imperium Romanum or Roman Empire.
Regnum Romanum was the monarchical government of the city of Rome and its territories.
Romanum decet pontificem is a papal bull issued by Pope Innocent XII (1691—1700) on June 22, 1692.

Religion
The Cultus deorum romanum is the name for the official state religion of Ancient Rome
The Old Roman Symbol (Romanum) is an ancient Christian creed
Decet Romanum Pontificem (1521) is the papal bull excommunicating Martin Luther.
Colloquium romanum was a Jesuit Marian elite organization, founded by Jesuit Father Jakob Rem in 1594 AD. 
Graduale Romanum (disambiguation).
Missale Romanum Glagolitice is a Croatian language missal printed in 1483. 
The Octavarium Romanum is a Catholic liturgical book which may be considered as an appendix to the Roman Breviary.
The Pontificale Romanum is the Roman Catholic liturgical book that contains the rites performed by bishops.
The Rituale Romanum is one of the official ritual works of the Roman Catholic rite.

Places
 Romanum (island), Micronesia